The Killer Bride is a 2019 Philippine drama television series starring Maja Salvador, Janella Salvador, Joshua Garcia and Geoff Eigenmann. The series premiered on ABS-CBN's Primetime Bida evening block and worldwide via The Filipino Channel from August 12, 2019 to January 17, 2020, replacing Sino ang Maysala?: Mea Culpa.

Series overview

Episodes

Season 1

References

Lists of Philippine drama television series episodes